Vilki is a rural locality (a village) in Vladimir, Vladimir Oblast, Russia. The population was 15 as of 2010. There is 1 street.

Geography 
Vilki is located 15 km southeast of Vladimir. Shepelevo is the nearest rural locality.

References 

Rural localities in Vladimir Urban Okrug